The Amathus sarcophagus is a Cypriot sarcophagus that likely held a king of Amathus. Its sides show procession scenes, and typify Cypriot, Greek, and Phoenician-Near Eastern styles of the mid-fifth century BCE. The sarcophagus was excavated by Luigi Palma di Cesnola and is currently located at the Metropolitan Museum of Art.

General references

External links 

 

Sculptures of the Metropolitan Museum of Art
Sarcophagi
Ancient Cyprus